The Trap Snaps Shut at Midnight is a 1966 West German thriller film directed by Harald Philipp and starring George Nader, Horst Frank and Heinz Weiss. It was the fourth film in the Jerry Cotton series.

Plot
A delivery truck of nitroglycerin is turned away from a mining area when an accident occurs. Two criminals, Lew Hutton and Fat Krusky, are waiting at a local diner to steal the truck, believing it to be empty. Hutton pulls over because the truck is driving sluggishly, and when the find the canisters of nitroglycerin, Krusky runs off. Later, Hutton uses the truck in Manhattan for a bogus accident which is a cover for a jewelry store robbery, committed by his accomplice, Maureen. The NYPD cordons off the area because of the warning notices on the truck, but when the head of the chemical company that owns the truck, Dr. Smeat, arrives, they discover the 20 canisters of nitroglycerin have been removed. The NYPD decides to call in the FBI. Jerry Cotton is called onto the case, but suggests to the department chief, Mr. High, that Phil Decker be placed in charge of the investigation. They are told by Dr. Smeat that the nitroglycerin must be kept cool, and that it's packed in ice, but they only have about 30 hours before it becomes unstable.

The gangster Larry Link hears about the robbery and has Krusky tortured, but without getting any information. Maureen appears at Link's headquarters and offers to help him find the nitroglycerin for payment. Maureen tells Link that Hutton got his information about where to hijack the truck from Dr. Smeat's secretary, Ruth Warren. Link sends his goons to Ruth's apartment to find out where Hutton is hiding. Cotton and Decker discover the connection between Warren and Hutton, and go to interview Warren. They find her being held by Link's men, and a fight happens. Freed, Warren tells Cotton and Decker where to find Hutton: at his mother's pinball arcade.

Cotton persuades Hutton to take, gets hold of the canisters. Link and his men are already at the hiding place, and Cotton is knocked out. When Cotton comes to, he finds out Link has killed Hutton and has the canisters of nitroglycerin. Link then informs the FBI he wants one million dollars for the canisters, otherwise he will let one of them explode somewhere in Manhattan. Link then calls a NYC newspaper with the information about the missing nitroglycerin to put pressure on the government and embarrass the FBI. This causes a panic in Manhattan.

Cotton trails one of Link's henchmen and discovers they have one of the canisters hanging from The Manhattan Bridge, and manages to stop the goon from setting off the nitroglycerin. Dr. Smeat shows up to help cool down the canister.

Link decides to kidnap Dr. Smeat to pressure the FBI further. The FBI decides to pay the ransom as a trap. The money handed over to Maureen in a briefcase, who escapes in a taxi. She takes the money to Link's accomplices, while Link stays with canisters and maintains contact over the radio. When Link's hears radio interference, he has his men search the briefcase. When they find the FBI had planted a tracking device in the case, Cotton and Decker bust in. Link hears this over his radio decides to set off the nitroglycerin, but Dr. Smeat yells their location (the Pennsylvania Express) over the radio to Cotton before Link can knock Dr. Smeat out. Cotton races to the railway and is able to kills Link before time is up. The FBI countdown clock stops at 0:07 minutes before the canisters get too warm.

Jerry is granted a well-deserved vacation, but as he's at the airport, he's called over the PA system that he's needed.

Cast
 George Nader as Jerry Cotton
 Horst Frank as Larry Link
 Heinz Weiss as Phil Decker
 Richard Münch as Mr. High
 Dominique Wilms as Maureen
 Allen Pinson as Harry
 Alexander Allerson as Husky
 Monika Grimm as Ruth Warren
 Helga Schlack as Helen Culver
 Ricky Cooper as Pal
 Werner Abrolat as Krot

Bibliography

References

External links

1966 films
West German films
German sequel films
German crime thriller films
1960s crime thriller films
1960s German-language films
Films directed by Harald Philipp
Films set in the United States
German black-and-white films
Films based on crime novels
Films based on German novels
Constantin Film films
1960s German films